The Royal Belgian Sea Cadet Corps (Dutch:Koninklijk Marine Kadettenkorps, French:Corps Royal des Cadets de Marine) is a Belgian non-profit youth organisation whose purpose is to stimulate teamwork and discipline in individuals from the age of 12, while teaching other important skills and values such as first aid, navigation and linguistic skills, operating a vessel, military drill and much more. The organization receives support from the Belgian Ministry of Defense.

Cadets are introduced to aspects of the nautical world and the military. The cadets are under the supervision of adult volunteers who usually organize activities, exercises and trainings and are also in charge of the administrative work within the Cadet Corps. Divisions meet every week, usually on Sunday, providing training and educational opportunities for cadets. The organization is nautically-based but is both active on water and land.

The Belgian Sea Cadet Corps operates a fleet of about a dozen small vessels, including a sailing yacht and several motor vessels.  These are used for training at sea or on lakes and canals. A few times a year, longer cruises are organised either within Belgium or neighbouring countries, such as the United Kingdom and the Netherlands.

No members of the Cadet Corps are required to join the Belgian military, nor is it required for the cadre to have a military background. Many cadets however, do join the military, law enforcement or are interested in jobs in the maritime sector. A remarkable number of the cadre are or have had a job in the military, law enforcement, maritime sector and medical or technical fields.

Although Cadet Corps in most other countries in a way part of their national military, the Royal Belgian Sea Cadet Corps is not. Despite this fact, the Belgian Defense Ministry frequently allows the Cadet Corps to use its bases, vehicles and equipment. During some national camps of the Cadet Corps, the Defense Ministry helps in organizing activities that are more military-oriented such as letting the cadets join in patrolling the Belgian coast with a patrol vessel of the Belgian Navy, physical training and obstacle courses, and ceremonial events such as the annual national military parade in Brussels on July 21.

The Belgian Sea Cadet Corps is also a member of the International Sea Cadet Association and often participates in international exchange programs.

History
After World War I, soon after the creation of the Torpedists and Seafarers Corps which was an early version of the Belgian Navy, a school was opened for cadets of the Belgian Maritime League. The school was a training unit to prepare the enrolled youth for a career in the navy or the merchant navy. The maritime schools in Antwerp and Ostend continued with training cadets, even after the disbandment of the Torpedists and Seafarers Corps in 1927. The Sea Cadet Corps was later changed into a non-profit organization, which it still is today.

In 1969 the Belgian Navy signed a convention, officially recognising and supporting the Sea Cadet Corps. At that time, Brussels and Liège were the only divisions.

The Sea Cadet Corps was awarded the use of the title "Royal" on its sixtieth anniversary in 1982.

On February 26, 2003, the Belgian Ministry of Defense and the cadet corps signed a new agreement which would improve mutual cooperation and is meant to promote the Navy and the Defense Ministry.

Organization
There are seven divisions across Belgium, with a total membership of a few hundred cadets and cadre.

The nine divisions are located at:-
Antwerpen (Antwerp)
Brussel/Bruxelles (Brussels)
Leopoldsburg
Ittre
Leuven
Oostende (Ostend)
Geel
Peutie (national staff)
Eupen (Sea Cadet Band Corps)

Fleet
The Royal Belgian Sea Cadet Corps owns a fleet of vessels including:
 V901 Leie (Former patrol boat P901)
 V902 Libération (Former patrol boat P902)
 K104 Sambre (Former patrol boat P904)
 MRB24
 Training Ship T25
 Papillon 
 Various small power boats, RHIBs, kayaks and sailboats

Training camps
Two annual nationwide training camps are organised:
Camp ORKA: This camp held annually, usually in August, at the Belgian coast. The cadets stay on an army or naval base near the coastline for about seven to ten days. The activities include sailing, kayaking, marching, medical training, physical training and marches per squad, squad-based training and activities involving teamwork, powerboating and using RHIBs, and much more.
Camp Leopoldsburg: This camp held annually, usually during the winter, on the Camp Leopoldsburg Army Base. Until recently, it used to take place in the Belgian Ardennes region and was considered to be the toughest camp of all. Activities include much marching and military drill, navigational and survival training, physical training, bivouac, medical drills, much squad-based teamwork activities, and much more.
(Camp Mol): This camp is rather new and isn't held annually. This camp is at a lake in the Antwerp province of Belgium. The activities are mostly water-based and recreational. Activities include; kayaking, RHIBs, swimming and waterborne rescue techniques.

During these camps, cadets will be put in multilingual squads of five to ten cadets and a Cadet First Class or Quartermaster will be appointed as a squad leader. The squad is given tasks and is supposed to do everything as a team and not as individuals. These squads get their own rooms or tents assigned and have to work and act as one.

During Camp ORKA, and especially Camp Leopoldsburg, divisions will try to get the annual division cup, called "the Challenge". This event is normally held during one of the last days and is completely different from the rest of the camp. Divisions will temporarily disband the established squads and will make their own with cadets from their division only. They will then complete a written exam per rank and will march a route, where they will get inspected at random locations, until they reach the base again. The points are tallied up the next day and the division that wins gets to keep "the Challenge" cup for a year. Some divisions will train their cadets from months in advance in the hopes to win.

Ranks and uniform structure
All members, except for civilian volunteers, are required to be in uniform while on base or during almost all exercises and activities. Members of the cadet corps hold certain ranks based on multiple different factors explained per group below.

There is no specific recruitment time; members are free to join or leave at any time. Cadets pay a small annual membership fee.

Cadets
Everyone can join from the age of 12 years old. New members will usually start as a Junior or as a Recruit, depending on their age. A member can stay in the group of cadets until the age of 21, where they then are required to leave, become a Civilian Volunteer or become a Petty Officer.

In order to rank up in the group of cadets, one must usually pass a written exam and a practical test, have shown to be of good moral character (meaning that they have not violated the rules and regulations). The period of at least one year must have passed in order to rank up in between each rank.

Ranks below "Cadet" are mostly taught practical and theoretical knowledge and are in normal circumstances never put in a leading role. From the age of fourteen, cadets are able to do their exam for the rank of "Cadet". A "Cadet" must pledge an oath in order to be promoted and is required to not violate this oath. Once a "cadet", cadets are given a bit more tasks that require learned knowledge. Usually, from the rank of cadet first class or Cadet Second Class, cadets are expected to develop leadership skills and lead small teams of cadets during tasks and exercises. Cadet First Classes, and especially Quartermasters, will often be appointed as a squad leader during national camps and is given more leadership requiring tasks as they are members of 16 years or older and are expected to be more responsible.

The highest rank one can achieve in the group of cadets is "Quartermaster". This rank is almost equivalent as being in the group of Petty Officers due to the responsibility given to the Quartermaster. The rank is also the least prevalent and is only held by a few cadets in the entire country. Quartermasters are also claimed to have the hardest exams as questions also test the knowledge needed for the previous ranks. They will often be given leadership requiring tasks in order to prepare them for the rank group of Petty Officer.

Cadets wear navy blue uniforms. Their full dress uniform is also mostly navy blue. Their rank insignia is usually red, with the exception of the rank of Junior First Class, which has a blue line. The rank of Junior First Class is also the only rank that doesn't exist in every division. The ranks of Junior, Recruit and Cadet have no rank insignia. A Cadet receives a white lanyard after taking the oath which is worn on both the work uniform as on the full dress uniform.

Ranks

Staff
All cadet units are staffed by unpaid officers and instructors, although some units may also have volunteer instructors.  Recruitment is on a vacancy-only basis.

Petty Officers

Officers

See also

Other naval cadet organisations 
 International Sea Cadet Association
 Other Sea Cadet organisations

References

External links
 International Sea Cadet Association
 Belgian Sea Cadet Corps, official web site in Dutch / French

Navy Cadets
Military youth groups
Naval Cadet organisations
Organisations based in Belgium with royal patronage